Claude Lalumière (born 1966) is an author, book reviewer and has edited numerous anthologies.  A resident of Montreal, Quebec, he writes the Montreal Gazette's Fantastic Fiction column.  He also owned and operated two independent book stores in Montreal. He and Rupert Bottenberg are co-creators of lostmyths.net.

Lalumière's own fiction consists mostly of short stories tending to dark fantasy. In a review of his first collection, Objects of Worship in Strange Horizons, Anil Menon characterised the title story and two others as generating "that wondering disquiet so hard to achieve with other literary genres" and noting that they were already being studied in writing courses.

Bibliography

Collections
 Objects of Worship (2009) ChiZine Publications; 
 The Door to Lost Pages (2011) ChiZine Publications; 
 Nocturnes and Other Nocturnes (2014) Infinity Plus Books

Anthologies
 Telling Stories: New English Stories from Quebec (2002) Véhicule Press; 
 Open Space: New Canadian Fantastic Fiction (2003) Red Deer Press; 
 Witpunk (2003) Running Press; 
 Island Dreams: Montreal Writers of the Fantastic (2004) Véhicule Press; 
 Short Stuff: New English Stories from Quebec (2005) Véhicule Press; 
 Lust for Life: Tales of Sex and Love (2006) Véhicule Press; 
 Tesseracts Twelve (2008) EDGE Science Fiction and Fantasy Publishing; 
 Super Stories of Heroes & Villains (Tachyon Publications, August 2013)

References

External links
 Home page
 Fantastic Fiction
 Story behind Super Stories of Heroes and Villains by Claude Lalumiere - How I Came to Select These Super Stories
 Story behind Nocturnes and Other Nocturnes by Claude Lalumiere
 

Living people
Writers from Montreal
Canadian male novelists
Canadian male short story writers
Canadian book editors
21st-century Canadian short story writers
1966 births
21st-century Canadian male writers